The Basilica of the Blessed Virgin Mary (Basilique Notre-Dame d’Afrique) is a Roman Catholic minor basilica dedicated to the Blessed Virgin Mary located in Lodonga, Uganda. The basilica is under the circumscription of the Diocese of Arua. The basilica was dedicated on May 26, 1961.

Location
Lodonga is located in Yumbe District, approximately, by road, west of Yumbe Town, where the district headquarters are located. The geographical coordinates of the basilica are 3°25'16.0"N,  31°06'50.0"E (Latitude:3.421111; Longitude:31.113889).

Overview
Construction of the basilica was initiated by Reverend Father Pietro Valcavi, a Comboni Missionary during the 1950s. He worked closely with Father Bernardo Sartori, Reverend Father Toni La Salandra, Brother Arosio, with the blessing of Monseigneur Angelo Negri.

The basilica was damaged during the war that removed Idi Amin from power in 1979. Repairs were don to repair and restore the cathedral, beginning in 1990, supervised by Brother Udeschini Giuseppe and Father Toni.

See also
 Basilica of the Uganda Martyrs
 Munyonyo Martyrs' Shrine

References

External links
The Basillicas (2) In Uganda

Basilica churches in Uganda
20th-century Roman Catholic church buildings in Uganda
Yumbe District
Roman Catholic churches completed in 1961
1961 establishments in Uganda
West Nile sub-region
Northern Region, Uganda